The current Constitution of Mongolia was adopted on 13 January 1992, put into force on 12 February, with amendments made in 1999, 2000 and 2019. The constitution established a representative democracy in Mongolia, enshrining core functions of the government, including the separation of powers and election cycle, and guaranteeing human rights including freedom of religion, travel, expression, private property. The document was written after the Mongolian Revolution of 1990, effectively dissolving the Mongolian People's Republic. 

It consists of a preamble followed by six chapters divided into seventy articles. It is heavily inspired by Western liberal democracies, evident in its protection of minority rights, freedom of expression and assembly and multi-party parliamentary system.

Constitutional history

The first codified constitution was introduced in 1924 with the creation of the People's Republic of Mongolia, with revision made in 1940 and in 1960.

Chapters

Chapter One
Declares the sovereignty and territorial integrity of the state. Defines relationship between religion and state. Defines Mongolian emblem, flag and anthem.

Chapter Two
Specifies the civil, political and inalienable rights of the individual: freedom of speech, of religion, of expression, of the press and the right to vote. Equality before the law. The right to government-provided health care, education and intellectual property. Lists duties of the citizen, including paying taxes and serving in the armed forces.

Chapter Three
Defines the structure of the legal system and form of the republic. Describes the structure of the government.

Chapter Four
Codifies the administrative districts of Mongolia and describes the relationship between national and local government.

Chapter Five
Establishes a Constitutional Court to make rulings on interpretation of the constitution.

Chapter Six
Describes the amendment process for changing the constitution.

2019 Constitutional amendments 
Mongolia has amended its constitution strengthening the powers of the prime minister in a bid to end years of political instability and economic stagnation. With the amendments, presidential term has also been shortened to single 6-year term.

The amendments in the constitution are supposed to enhance the economic opportunities of the Mongolian citizenry and give them better control over how the country's vast natural resources and the revenues earned from them are maintained. Furthermore, the amendments increased the independence of the judiciary by stripping the president of his power to appoint judges in key posts, and establish parliamentary rather than executive oversight over judicial matters. The amendments featured vigorous participation of ordinary people as well as incumbent politicians. Proportional representation as a system to elect lawmakers were rejected, though the constitutional changes guaranteed that election laws are not changed a year before polls are held.

In 2022, lawmakers started to investigate a potential revision of the constitution to strengthen democracy while touting the virtues of the Westminster system. If the amendment is ratified, the president would be stripped of much of their power.

See also 
 Politics in Mongolia
 State Great Khural
 President of Mongolia
 Prime Minister of Mongolia

References

Further reading 
 S. Narangerel, Legal System of Mongolia, Interpress, 2004

External links 
 Mongolia's Constitution of 1992 with Amendments through 2001 
 Text of the constitution of Mongolia in English

Government of Mongolia
Law of Mongolia
Mongolia